Kua Kia Soong (born 1950) is a Malaysian social activist, researcher and former member of parliament for Petaling Jaya (1990–1995). He is a director of the human-rights organisation SUARAM.

Family 
Kua's grandfather, Kua Kim Pah, was an immigrant from Chaozhou China and founder of a bank in Batu Pahat, Johor. His brother is Kua Ee Heok, a psychiatrist based in Singapore.

Education 
Kua was educated at SRJK Cina Lim Poon and SMK Tinggi Batu Pahat. He then received a BA and MA in economics from the University of Manchester. He holds a PhD in sociology. He served as principal of New Era College, Kajang, Selangor.

Election results

Published work 

 Questioning Arms Spending in Malaysia :Gerakbudaya, 2010.
 New Era College controversy : the betrayal of Dong Jiao Zong : Oriengroup, c2009.
 13 May: Declassified Documents on the Malaysian Riots of 1969: Suaram Komunikasi, c2007.
 Policing the Malaysian police / editor Kua Kia Soong. :Suaram Komunikasi, 2005
 The Malaysian : civil rights movement :SIRD, 2005.
 Malaysian political realities :Oriengroup, 1992.
 Malaysian cultural policy and democracy / compiled & edited by Kua Kia Soong. :The Resource and Research Centre, 1990.
 Of myths and mystification, 1986
 Malaysian political myths, 1990
 445 days behind the wire, 1989
 Reforming Malaysia, 1993
 Malaysia's energy crisis, 1996
 445 days under Operation Lalang, 2000
 Malaysian Critical Issues, 2002
 Xin ji yuan jiao yu
 20 years defending human rights
 The Chinese schools of Malaysia, 1990
 Inside the DAP, 1990–95 (1996)
 Protean Saga: The Chinese Schools of Malaysia
 13 May: Declassified Documents on the Malaysian Riots of 1969. Buku ini terbit pada 2007 oleh SUARAM.

References 

1950 births
Malaysian politicians of Chinese descent
Malaysian people of Teochew descent
Democratic Action Party (Malaysia) politicians
Malaysian human rights activists
People from Batu Pahat
Living people